Dimity Dornan AO is a speech pathologist, author, social entrepreneur, bionics advocate, researcher, and businesswoman in Brisbane, Queensland, Australia.  She is the founder of  the Hear and Say Centre for Deaf Children on 6 July 1992 and helped initiate newborn hearing screening in Queensland hospitals, the first such program in Australia.  She has received Australian of the Year for Queensland in 2003, and the Suncorp Queenslander of the Year in 2010. Griffith University offers a Dimity Dornan Hear and Say Master of Speech  Pathology Scholarship for second year students who have an interest in paediatric speech pathology and working in a regional area.

Career 
Dornan was the first speech pathology graduate at the University of Queensland, and the first speech pathologist to work at the Royal Brisbane Hospital.

Dornan has been attributed for her ground-breaking auditory verbal work which has assisted families and hearing-impaired children throughout Queensland.  Hear and Say is now a global Hearing Health Education and Development Program with six centres across Queensland, including a telepractice for remote regions of Queensland. 

Dornan is the founder of Bionics Queensland (BioniQ) which was established to promote the development of the human bionic industry in Queensland.

Dornan is also the founder of Human Bionics Interface, which an international network of bionics researchers, clinicians, businesses that share projects to delivery bionics solutions.

Dornan retired from the role as Executive Director, Hear and Say, and moved into an ambassador role in 2022.

Achievements 
In 2017, Dornan was inducted into the Queensland Business Leaders Hall of Fame.

In October 2017, Dornan was elected to the University of Queensland Senate by the graduates of the university. 

In 2003 she received Australian of the Year for Queensland, and in 2010  the Suncorp Queenslander of the Year.

Awards 
Churchill Fellowship 1992
 Member of the Order of Australia 1998
 Fellow of Speech Pathology Australia 1999
 Australian Medical Association (AMA) Award for Distinction for Services to Medicine 1999
 Australian of the Year for Queensland 2003
 Ernst & Young Australian Social Entrepreneur of the Year 2005
 Suncorp Queenslander of the Year 2010
 University of Queensland Alumnus of the Year 2011
Telstra Business Women’s Awards Business Woman of the Year for Queensland and White Pages Community and Government Award (2011)
 Queensland Greats 2013
 Dame of Honour 2013
 Order of St John of Jerusalem (Knights Hospitaller) 2013
 Officer of the Order of Australia 2014
 Lord Mayor's Business Awards, Lifetime Achievement Award 2014
 McCullough Robertson Life Sciences Queensland Industry Excellence Award 2015
 Women in Technology Life Sciences Award 2016
 Brisbane Women in Business Award (Innovation and Technology) 2016
 Women in Technology Life Sciences Outstanding Achievement Award 2016
 Women in Business Innovation and Technology Award 2016 
 Queensland Business Leaders Hall of Fame 2017
 Queensland Senior Australian of the Year 2018

References

External links 
Queensland Business Leaders Hall of Fame - 2017 Inductee digital story - Dr Dimity Dornan AO
 Women in Technology
 Disability and carers
 State Library of Queensland - The Petrie Family
 State Library of Queensland - Alice with eyes a-shine
 State Library of Queensland - Proquest - Social inclusion for children with hearing loss in listening and spoken Language early intervention: an exploratory study
 State Library of Queensland - Proquest - Exploring the impact of spoken language on social inclusion for children with hearing loss ...
 Hear and Say
 Bionics Queensland
 The University of Queensland School of Health and Rehabilitation Sciences - Profile - Dr Dimity Dornan, Adjunct Professor
 Senior Australian of the Year Awards
 Churchill Trust Fellow - Dimity Dornan

Speech and language pathologists
Living people
Officers of the Order of Australia
Australian businesspeople
Australian of the Year Award winners
Fellows of the Australian Academy of Technological Sciences and Engineering
Year of birth missing (living people)